El Dorado Pass is a 1948 American Western film directed by Ray Nazarro and written by Earle Snell. The film stars Charles Starrett, Smiley Burnette, Elena Verdugo, Steve Darrell, Rory Mallinson and Ted Mapes. The film was released on October 14, 1948, by Columbia Pictures.

Plot

Cast          
Charles Starrett as Steve Clayton / The Durango Kid
Smiley Burnette as Smiley Burnette
Elena Verdugo as Dolores Martinez
Steve Darrell as Page
Rory Mallinson as Sheriff Tom Wright
Ted Mapes as Dodd
Stanley Blystone as Barlow
Shorty Thompson as Shorty Thompson

References

External links
 

1948 films
1940s English-language films
American Western (genre) films
1948 Western (genre) films
Columbia Pictures films
Films directed by Ray Nazarro
American black-and-white films
1940s American films